The Message: The Bible in Contemporary Language (MSG) is a paraphrase of the Bible in contemporary English. Authored by Eugene H. Peterson and published in segments from 1993 to 2002.

Features 
According to the Introduction to the New Testament of The Message, its "contemporary idiom keeps the language of the Message (Bible) current and fresh and understandable".  Peterson notes that in the course of the project, he realized this was exactly what he had been doing in his thirty-five years as a pastor, "always looking for an English way to make the biblical text relevant to the conditions of the people".

Translation consultants 

The publisher states: "Peterson's work has been thoroughly reviewed by a team of recognized Old and New Testament scholars to ensure that it is accurate and faithful to the original languages."

Old Testament team:
 Robert L. Hubbard Jr., North Park Theological Seminary (chair)
 Richard E. Averbeck, Trinity Evangelical Divinity School
 Bryan E. Beyer, Columbia International University
 Lamar E. Cooper Sr., Criswell College
 E. Enns, Eastern University
 Duane A. Garrett, The Southern Baptist Theological Seminary
 Donald R. Glenn, Dallas Theological Seminary
 Paul R. House, Beeson Divinity School, Samford University
 V. Philips Long, Regent College
 Tremper Longman, Westmont College
 John N. Oswalt, Asbury Theological Seminary
 Richard L. Pratt Jr., Reformed Theological Seminary, Third Mill Ministries 
 H. Walton, Wheaton College
 Prescott H. Williams Jr., Austin Presbyterian Theological Seminary
 Marvin R. Wilson, Gordon College

New Testament team:
 William W. Klein, Denver Seminary (chair)
 L. Bock, Dallas Theological Seminary
 A. Hagner, Fuller Theological Seminary
 Moises Silva, Gordon-Conwell Theological Seminary
 Rodney A. Whitacre, Trinity School of Ministry

Comparison to other translations 
The Message was translated by Peterson from the original languages. It is a highly idiomatic translation, using contemporary slang from the US rather than a more neutral International English, and it falls on the extreme dynamic end of the dynamic and formal equivalence spectrum. Some scholars, like Michael J. Gorman, consider some of Peterson's idiomatic renderings unconventional. The work was awarded the Evangelical Christian Publishers Association Gold Medallion in 2003 for being the title retailers prized.

Psalm 23:1-4 

New International Version:

King James Version:

The Living Bible:

The Message:

Lord's Prayer (Matthew 6:9-13) 

New International Version:

King James Version:

The Living Bible:

The Message:

Editions 
Old Testament:
 The Pentateuch: 
 The Books of History: 
 The Wisdom Books: 
 The Prophets: 

New Testament:
 Youth Edition: 
 Text Edition: 

Entire Bible:
 With verse markings (The Message Remix): 
 Without verse markings: 
 With verse markings (The Message: The Numbered Edition): ; this edition was recognized as an ECPA Christian Book Award winner.
 Catholic/Ecumenical Edition: 2013,

Notes

References

External links 

 Publisher's History & FAQ (most recently available archived version)
 The Message text online
 Eugene Peterson interview at a U2 fansite

2002 books
2002 in Christianity
Bible translations into English